Pakistan has been a member of the International Monetary Fund (IMF) since 1950. Due to the unpredictable nature of its economy and its dependence on imports, the IMF has provided loans to Pakistan on twenty-two occasions, with its most recent being in 2019.

History
Pakistan joined IMF on 11 July 1950 as newly established country was facing fiscal problems since its creation in 1947 from British India.

In 1958, for the first time, Pakistan went to IMF for bailout. For this, IMF lent out ,000 [originally the loan-amount is given in SDR; for this article it is considered to be 1SDR = 1USD] to Pakistan on standby arrangement basis on 8 December 1958. Pakistan again went to IMF in 1965. This time, IMF gave ,000 to war-torn nation on 16 March 1965. Three years later, Pakistan again went to IMF for third time for balance of payment problems for which IMF gave ,000 on 17 October 1968. 

In 1971, Pakistan lost its Eastern half, East Pakistan, after the Bangladesh Liberation War. This war caused huge loses to Pakistan. For which, Pakistan got loan of ,000 in 1972, ,000 in 1973 and another of ,000 in 1974 to meet its growing needs. In 1977, another standby arrangement of ,000 was made on urgent basis. Three years later, an extended facility of ,000 was reached in 1980. Struggle of Pakistan continued, as Pakistan withdrew another ,000 as Pakistan was already part of US cold war against Soviet Union. 

Another era was started, as democracy came back to Pakistan but old ways to handle economy poorly continued. Benazir Bhutto government withdrawn ,000 as standby arrangement and another ,000 in shape of structural adjustment facility commitment on 28 December 1988. In 1990, government of Nawaz Sharif decided against going to IMF instead arranged donations from friendly countries like Saudi Arabia. 

In 1993, Benazir Bhutto again came to power and her government again went to IMF and reached an agreement to get standby arrangement of ,000 on 16 September 1993. Poor handling of economy continued by her government as she got loan of ,000 under the extended fund facility and another ,000 were borrowed on 22 February 1994. During that period economy of Pakistan remained in poor shape and Pakistan had to go to IMF again for record third in the period of Bhutto government. As per few sources, this was the most corrupt government in the history of Pakistan. This time Pakistan got an amount of ,000 on 13 December 1995.

In 1997, Nawaz Sharif came to power. Benazir Bhutto government was sacked on the corruption charges and left economy of Pakistan in worst shape. Sharif government went to IMF on urgent basis for the first time and reached an agreement to get two amounts of ,000 and ,000 on October 20, 1997.

In 2008, Yousaf Raza Gillani received a $7.6 billion loan from the IMF.

In 2018, Imran Khan became Prime Minister of Pakistan. For this, they arranged friendly loans from Saudi Arabia, United Arab Emirates and China to avoid tough IMF conditions. IMF gave loan based on conditions such as hike in energy tariffs, removal of energy subsidy, increase in taxation, privatization of public entities and fiscal policies to the budget.

References

Foreign relations of Pakistan
International Monetary Fund relations
Economy of Pakistan
National debt of Pakistan